Pigsty is a 1969 Italian film, written and directed by Pier Paolo Pasolini and starring Jean-Pierre Léaud, Marco Ferreri, Ugo Tognazzi, Pierre Clémenti, Alberto Lionello, Franco Citti and Anne Wiazemsky.

Plot
The film features two parallel stories. The first one is set in an unknown past time and is about a young man (Clémenti) who wanders in a volcanic landscape (shot around Etna) and turns into a cannibal. The man joins forces with a thug (Citti) and ravages the countryside. At the end, he and his gang get arrested and at his execution, he recites the famous tagline of the film: "I killed my father, I ate human flesh and I quiver with joy." The story is about the human capacity of destruction and a rebellion against the social prerequisites implied against it.

The second story is about Herr Klotz (Lionello), a German industrialist and his young son Julian (Léaud) who live in 1960s Germany. Julian, instead of passing time with his radically politicised fiancée Ida (Wiazemsky), prefers to build relationships with pigs. Herr Klotz, on the other hand, with his loyal aide Hans Guenther (Ferreri), tries to solve his rivalry with fellow industrialist Herdhitze (Tognazzi). The two industrialists join forces while Julian gets eaten by pigs in the sty. Herdhitze intends to conceal the event. The story attempts to provide a link between the Third Reich and Wirtschaftswunder Germany.

Reception
On review aggregator website Rotten Tomatoes, the film has a rating of 56% based on 9 critics, with an average rating of 5.7/10.

References

External links

Italian avant-garde and experimental films
Films directed by Pier Paolo Pasolini
Films about cannibalism
Films scored by Benedetto Ghiglia
1960s Italian-language films
1960s Italian films